Joanna Walsh is an author, editor and artist.

Life 
Joanna Walsh is the author of seven books including the digital work, Seed. Her books include Break.up,  Vertigo, Hotel, Fractals, Grow a Pair and Worlds From the World's End. Her writing has been widely anthologised. She has edited fiction and creative non-fiction at 3AM Magazine, Catapult, Five Dials and Gorse Editions. From 2014–18, she created and ran the campaign @read_women. In 2017 she was awarded the UK Arts Foundation Fellowship in Literature. She currently lives in Dublin.

Bibliography 

 Fractals (2013), Paris: 3:AM Press, ISBN 9780992684204.
 Shklovsky’s Zoo (2015), London: A Piece of Paper Press, no ISBN.
 Vertigo (2015), Saint Louis: Dorothy, a Publishing Project /  Dublin: Tramp Press.
 Hotel (2015) New York: Bloomsbury Literary Studies, ISBN 9781628924732.
 Grow a Pair (2015), Berlin: Readux, ISBN 9783944801384.
 Seed (2017), London: Visual Editions, digital novel.
 Worlds from The Word’s End (2017), Sheffield: And Other Stories, ISBN 9781911508106
 Hasard Objectif (2018), London: Goldsmiths Press, no ISBN.
 Break.up: A Novel in Essays (2018), Pasedena: Semiotext(e), ISBN 9781635900149 / London: Tuskar Rock, ISBN 9781781259931.
 Seed, print novel and artist’s book (2021), Belfast: No Alibis Press, ISBN 9781838108106.
 My Life as a Godard Movie (2021), Milan: Juxta / (2022), Oakland: Transit, ISBN 9781945492648.
 Girl Online: A User Manifesto (2022), London: Verso, ISBN 9781839765353.
 Miss-Communication (2022), London: JOAN, ISBN 9781999327644.
 Autobiology'' (2022), Lawrence, KS: Inside the Castle.

References 

1970 births
21st-century British writers
People from Hemsworth
Living people